XHEMG-FM is a radio station on 94.3 FM in Arriaga, Chiapas, Mexico. It carries La Ke Buena national grupera format from Radiópolis.

History
XEMG-AM 1250 received its concession on February 6, 1964, owned by Noe Vázquez Gómez. In 1980, it was transferred to Elena Saenz Vda. de Vázquez after Noe's death; in 2004, the name was corrected to Elena Sanz López. López sold the station to Radio Núcleo in September 2005, a change authorized by the SCT in May 2006, this corporation that moved it to FM in 2010.

References

1964 establishments in Mexico
Radio stations established in 1964
Radio stations in Chiapas
Regional Mexican radio stations
Spanish-language radio stations